Predrag Ranđelović (Serbian Cyrillic: Предраг Ранђеловић, Macedonian: Предраг Ранѓеловиќ; born 20 March 1990) is a Macedonian football player who plays for Utsikten in Sweden and played for the Macedonian national football team between 2012 and 2013.

Club career
Ranđelović came through the youth system of Partizan, before making his senior debut for their affiliated club Teleoptik. He then moved to Macedonian club Vardar in the summer of 2011. In the following two seasons, Ranđelović was a regular member of the team that won back-to-back championship titles in 2012 and 2013.

International career
Born in Serbia, Ranđelović received Macedonian citizenship while playing in the country. He was subsequently called up to the Macedonia U21s in August 2012.

Ranđelović was also capped three times for the senior side of his adopted country, making his debut in a 1–4 friendly loss to Poland on 14 December 2012. His final international was an October 2013 FIFA World Cup qualification match against Serbia.

Honours
Vardar
 Macedonian First League: 2011–12, 2012–13

References

External links
 
 

1990 births
Living people
Sportspeople from Niš
Serbian people of Macedonian descent
Association football midfielders
Serbian footballers
Macedonian footballers
North Macedonia under-21 international footballers
North Macedonia international footballers
FK Teleoptik players
FK Vardar players
FK Jagodina players
FC Minsk players
Dalkurd FF players
IFK Värnamo players
GAIS players
Utsiktens BK players
Serbian First League players
Macedonian First Football League players
Serbian SuperLiga players
Belarusian Premier League players
Superettan players
Ettan Fotboll players
Serbian expatriate footballers
Macedonian expatriate footballers
Expatriate footballers in Belarus
Macedonian expatriate sportspeople in Belarus
Expatriate footballers in Sweden
Macedonian expatriate sportspeople in Sweden